Sentry is a highly automated impact prediction system operated by the JPL Center for NEO Studies (CNEOS) since 2002. It continually monitors the most up-to-date asteroid catalog for possibilities of future impact with Earth over the next 100+ years. Whenever a potential impact is detected it will be analyzed and the results immediately published by the Center for Near-Earth Object Studies. However, several weeks of optical data are not enough to conclusively identify an impact years in the future. By contrast, eliminating an entry on the risk page is a negative prediction, a prediction of where it will not be.

Scientists warn against worrying about the possibility of impact with an object based on only a few weeks of optical data that show a possible Earth encounter years from now. Sometimes, it cannot even be said for certain what side of the Sun such an object will be at the time of the listed virtual impactor date. For example, even though  had a 1-in-500,000 chance of impacting Earth on 11 March 2023, it was expected to be farther than the Sun at the time. Most objects on the Sentry Risk Table have an observation arc of less than 14 days and have not been observed for years.

There are 1538 near-Earth asteroids listed on the risk table with 36,718 virtual impactor dates. For each asteroid listed on the risk table there are on average about 24 virtual impactors. Only about 17 objects on the risk list are large enough to be considered potentially hazardous objects with a diameter greater than about 140 meters. The average size of an object on the default page of Sentry is 120 meters with an average impact probability of 1:500. More eccentric orbits (such as ) that extend to nearly the orbit of Jupiter can make atmospheric entry at velocities of ~40 km/s.

Sentry Risk Table

The Impact Risk page lists a number of lost minor planets that are, for all practical purposes, permanent residents of the risk page; their removal may depend upon a serendipitous rediscovery.

 is the asteroid with greatest probability (10%) of impacting Earth, but is only ~7 meters in diameter. The only numbered objects with observation arcs of several years are (29075) 1950 DA and 101955 Bennu.

Of the 145 asteroids with better than a 1-in-10,000 chance of impacting Earth only 101955 Bennu is larger than 50 meters in diameter.

It is estimated to be 120-meters in diameter, has a short observation arc of 3.1-days, and is expected to be  from Earth on 11 August 2040.

With a 24-day observation arc,  has the most virtual impactors with 1244 virtual impactor dates.

The diameter of most near-Earth asteroids that have not been studied by radar or infrared can generally only be estimated within about a factor of 2 based on the asteroid's absolute magnitude (H). Their mass, consequently, is uncertain by about a factor of 10. For near-Earth asteroids without a well-determined diameter, Sentry assumes a generic albedo of 0.15.

In August 2013, the Sentry Risk Table started using planetary ephemeris (DE431) for all NEO orbit determinations. DE431 (JPL small-body perturber ephemeris: SB431-BIG16) better models the gravitational perturbations of the planets and includes the 16 most massive main-belt asteroids. In April 2021, Sentry transitioned to DE441 which removed the very low impact probability of short-arc 2014 MV67 which had been less than 1:1-billion. The switch to DE441 also briefly added in the harmless Jupiter trojan 2014 ES57 with a very low impact probability of about 1:1-billion.

JPL launched major changes to the website in February 2017 and re-directed the classic page on 10 April 2017.

In 2021 JPL launched Sentry-II which handles the Yarkovsky effect that can significantly change a small asteroids path over decades and centuries. Sentry-II defaults to a Impact Pseudo-Observation (IOBS) analysis technique that runs an extended orbit-determination filter that tries to converge to an impacting solution compatible with the observational data.

Numbers 

, there are over 31,534 near-Earth objects of which roughly 1,538 near-Earth asteroids are listed on the risk table. Only around 17 objects on the risk table are large enough to qualify as potentially hazardous objects with a diameter greater than 140 meters (absolute magnitude brighter than 22). About 99% of the objects on the risk table are less than roughly 140 meters in diameter. Roughly 1,100 of these risk-listed near-Earth asteroids are estimated to be about the size of the Chelyabinsk meteor (H>26), which killed no one but had 1,491 non-direct injuries; or smaller. More than 3,069 asteroids have been removed from the risk table since it launched in 2002.

The only two comets that briefly appeared on the Sentry Risk Table are 197P/LINEAR (2003 KV2) and 300P/Catalina (2005 JQ5).

JPL SBDB comparison 
The JPL Small-Body Database close approach table lists a linearized uncertainty. Sentry computations explore alternate orbit solutions along the line of variations and account for orbit propagation nonlinearities.

Scout 
Sentry's little brother Scout scans recently detected objects on the Minor Planet Center's Near-Earth Object Confirmation Page with designations that are user-assigned and unofficial as they have not been confirmed by additional observations. The impact risk assessment is rated on a scale of 0–4 (negligible, small, modest, moderate, or elevated). Scout is used to help identify imminent impactors.

See also
 Asteroid impact prediction
 Earth-grazing fireball
 Impact event
 List of asteroid close approaches to Earth
 List of Earth-crossing asteroids
 Meteoroid
 NEODyS
 Time-domain astronomy

Notes

References

External links
 Sentry: Introduction
 Sentry: Impact Risk Data table
 List of objects for which all previously detected potential impacts have been eliminated
 Similar lists: NEODyS CLOMON2 / ESA NEO Risk List / Sormano Observatory TECA / Simplified List
 Asteroid Hazards, Part 3: Finding the Path – Minor Planet Center on YouTube
 Scout: NEOCP Hazard Assessment: Introduction

Near-Earth object tracking
Planetary defense
Space program of the United States
JPL online services